Dichomeris synergastis is a moth in the family Gelechiidae. It was described by Ponomarenko and Park in 1996. It is found in Korea.

The forewings are greyish yellow, darker towards the distal part and with a large, distinct dark brown spot near the base, as well as two hardly visible discal dots. The hindwings are brownish grey.

References

Moths described in 1996
synergastis